Roger Rérolle (26 February 1909 – 30 December 1990) was a French long-distance runner. He competed at the 1936 Summer Olympics in the 3000 m steeplechase and finished in 11th place. He also competed at the International Cross Country Championships in 1929–1938 and won six silver and one bronze medals with the French team. His best individual result was sixth place in 1936.

References

1909 births
1990 deaths
French male long-distance runners
Olympic athletes of France
Athletes (track and field) at the 1936 Summer Olympics
French male steeplechase runners
Sportspeople from Dijon
20th-century French people